Rareș "Chris" Șerban (born November 15, 1995) is a Canadian soccer player who last played for Cavalry FC in the Canadian Premier League.

Club career

Early career
Şerban spent his youth career with the Calgary Villains, spent one year with the Calgary Chinooks before moving to the Whitecaps FC Residency program. He spent his college career at the University of British Columbia.  In his only season with the Thunderbirds, he made 16 appearances and tallied two assists and was named 2014 CIS Rookie of the Year.

Şerban also played in the Premier Development League for Vancouver Whitecaps FC U-23.

Whitecaps FC 2
On February 24, 2015, Şerban signed a professional contract with Whitecaps FC 2, a USL affiliate club of Vancouver Whitecaps FC.  He made his professional debut on March 29 in a 4–0 defeat to Seattle Sounders FC 2. He would spend three seasons with Whitecaps FC 2 before the club ceased operations after the 2017 season. Şerban would not be signed to a USL deal with the Whitecaps new affiliate, Fresno FC.

Cavalry FC
After playing the 2018 PDL season with Calgary Foothills FC, Şerban joined Cavalry FC of the Canadian Premier League in December 2018. In April 2019 it was revealed Şerban suffered a season-ending knee injury during a pre-season match with FC Edmonton.

International career
Şerban is eligible to represent Canada through naturalization and Romania through birth.

Şerban was a member of the Canadian under-20 national team that competed in the 2015 CONCACAF U-20 Championship.

In May 2016, Şerban was called to Canada's U23 national team for a pair of friendlies against Guyana and Grenada. Şerban saw action in both matches.

Personal life
Şerban was born in Bistrița, Bistrița-Năsăud to Romanian parents. At age two, he and his family moved to Calgary, Alberta.

Honours

Calgary Foothills
PDL Championship: 2018

Calvary FC
Canadian Premier League (Regular season): 
Champions: Spring 2019, Fall 2019
 Canadian Premier League Finals
Runners-up: 2019

Individual
CIS Rookie of the Year: 2014

References

External links
Chris Serban at Whitecaps FC 2
Chris Serban at UBC Thunderbirds

1995 births
Living people
Association football defenders
Canadian soccer players
Sportspeople from Bistrița
Soccer players from Calgary
Romanian emigrants to Canada
Naturalized citizens of Canada
UBC Thunderbirds soccer players
Vancouver Whitecaps FC U-23 players
Whitecaps FC 2 players
Cavalry FC players
USL League Two players
USL Championship players
Canadian Premier League players
Canada men's youth international soccer players
2015 CONCACAF U-20 Championship players
Canada men's under-23 international soccer players